Viatkosuchus is an extinct genus of therocephalians known from the Late Capitanian–Wuchiapingian Deltavjatia Assemblage Zone.

See also

 List of therapsids

References

 The main groups of non-mammalian synapsids at Mikko's Phylogeny Archive

Whaitsiids
Fossils of Russia
Fossil taxa described in 1995
Taxa named by Leonid Petrovich Tatarinov
Therocephalia genera